Charny is a district (secteur) within the Les Chutes-de-la-Chaudière-Est borough of the city of Lévis, Quebec. It is located on the south shore of the St. Lawrence River, south of Quebec City. Formerly an independent city, Charny was merged with Lévis on January 1, 2002.

History
Over the last century, Charny has been tremendously influenced socially and economically by the Canadian National Railway which maintains a major national train yard in the town, Joffre Yard.  The roundhouse in the yard was designated a National Historic Site of Canada in 1992.

Charny expanded in population during the late 1980s and early 1990s when new neighbourhoods were surveyed and houses were built.

Charny has reached regional exposure many times over the last twenty years struggling with Alex Couture Inc., a plant which buys animal corpses in order to recycle them, producing salable by-products. The plant generated bad smells and odours throughout the city. The plant has installed filters to screen out any odours.

There is a waterfall that is located in the town on the Chaudière River. It offers a beautiful scene as well as a long narrow suspension bridge that one can walk across to get to the other side of the river (Saint-Rédempteur).

Demographics
Population according to Canada Census 2006

Population:  10,367
% Change 2001-2006: -1.3
Dwellings: 4,686
Density per km2: 1,284.6
Area per km2: 8.07

Education
Charny is within the Commission scolaire des Navigateurs, which operates the École secondaire les Etchemins.

References

Neighbourhoods in Lévis, Quebec
Former municipalities in Quebec
Populated places disestablished in 2002